The Engineering School was a high school serving grades 912 that was located in Boston, Massachusetts, United States. It was founded in 2005 and existed until 2011.

References

High schools in Boston
Educational institutions established in 2005
Educational institutions disestablished in 2011
Public high schools in Massachusetts
2005 establishments in Massachusetts
2011 disestablishments in Massachusetts
Defunct schools in Massachusetts